The Reichsforst ("Imperial Forest") is a wooded area in the southeastern part of the Fichtelgebirge Mountains of southern Germany. It lies in the districts of Tirschenreuth and Wunsiedel (northeastern Bavaria), and between the Wondreb and  Röslau troughs.

Maps 
 Bayerisches Landesvermessungsamt: UK 50-13 Naturpark Fichtelgebirge/Steinwald östlicher Teil, Maßstab 1:50.000

External links 
 Der Reichsforst im Fichtelgebirge

Fichtel Mountains
Mountain ranges of Bavaria